Länsförsäkringar Bank is the 5th largest Swedish bank, owned by the Länsförsäkringar Group.

History
In 1998, it was merged with the insurance company Wasa (försäkringsbolag).

References

External links
Länsförsäkringar Bank - Official site

Banks of Sweden